Bushra Rozza (known professionally as Bushra; born October 5, 1981), is an Egyptian actress and singer. She earned the Best Actress award at the Dubai International Film Festival for her role in 678.

Early life
Bushra was born in Cambridge, England, to the Egyptian writer Ahmed Abdalla Rozza, and a mother who worked as a human development consultant concerned with women's rights. She moved to Cairo, Egypt when she was 10 years old.

Career
Bushra began her career as a broadcaster on satellite television and then moved to acting in 2002. Her first role was on the sitcom Shabab Online (Youth Online). She then worked in a variety of roles in both comedy and drama productions. She won an early award for her 2004 film Alexandria... New York, directed by Youssef Chahine. She has released musical albums, including Makanak (Your Place) and Ehki (Talk), and also the music video Cobra, which criticized actor Mohamed Ramadan.

Bushra is also the founder of El Gouna Film Festival, a festival that was established to promote cultural interaction. On the issue of sexual harassment, she has said "Politicians alone do not create change. It is high time for us actors and filmmakers to also participate."

Personal life
Bushra was married to Syrian engineer and businessman Amr Raslan, with whom she has two children, from 2010 to 2015.

Age
Several sources stated that she was born in 1976, but she later mentioned that she was born in the 1980s. Her official Facebook account stated 5 October as a birth date, and one source reported 1981.

Selected filmography

Films
 Alexandria... New York (2004)
 678 (2010)
 Mr. & Mrs. Ewis (2012)

TV series
 Hidden Worlds (2018)

Discography
 Tabat & Nabat (2005)
 Cobra (2018)

References 

1981 births
Living people
Egyptian film actresses
Egyptian television actresses
21st-century Egyptian women singers
British emigrants to Egypt